Meysamabad (also Romanized as Meys̄amābād) is a village in Khondab Rural District, in the Central District of Khondab County, Markazi Province, Iran. At the 2006 census, its population was 167, in 41 families.

References 

Populated places in Khondab County